Susan Rene Bartholomew-Williams (born June 17, 1969 in Long Beach, California) is a triathlete from the United States.

She competed at the second Olympic triathlon at the 2004 Summer Olympics.  She was the first U.S. triathlete to win an Olympic medal by taking the bronze in 2004 in Athens. She placed third with a total time of 2:05:08.92.  Her split times were 19:02 for the swim, 1:08:58 for the cycling, and 0:37:08 for the run.

Williams obtained a Master of Science in Aerospace Engineering Sciences and was working toward becoming an astronaut when her success at triathlon convinced her to give it a try.

See also
 Triathlon at the Summer Olympics
 List of Olympic medalists in triathlon

References
Notes

Sources
 
 USA Triathlon

1969 births
Living people
American female triathletes
Triathletes at the 2004 Summer Olympics
Olympic triathletes of the United States
Olympic bronze medalists for the United States in triathlon
Sportspeople from Long Beach, California
Medalists at the 2004 Summer Olympics
21st-century American women